San Martino di Finita is a town and comune in the province of Cosenza in the Calabria region of southern Italy.

It was founded in the late 15th-early 16th centuries by Arbëreshë refugees.

References

Arbëresh settlements
Cities and towns in Calabria